Johannes Holler (1614–1671) was a Roman Catholic prelate who served as Auxiliary Bishop of Trier (1663–1671).

Biography
Johannes Holler was born in Echternach, Germany in 1614 and ordained a priest in 1652. On 27 Aug 1663, he was appointed during the papacy of Pope Alexander VII as Auxiliary Bishop of Trier and Titular Bishop of Azotus. On 1 Jun 1664, he was consecrated bishop by Karl Kaspar von Leyen-Hohengeroldseck, Archbishop of Trier. He served as Auxiliary Bishop of Trier until his death on 20 November 1671.

References 

17th-century Roman Catholic bishops in the Holy Roman Empire
Bishops appointed by Pope Alexander VII
1614 births
1671 deaths